Ngela or Ngggela may refer to:
 Guela, Republic of the Congo, also known as Ngela
 Nggela Islands, also known as the Florida Islands, a small island group in the Central Province of Solomon Islands in the southwest Pacific Ocean
 Nggela Channel, one of the waterways between the Nggela Islands and Taivu Point on the northeast side of Guadalcanal